Baloobhai Patel is a businessman and entrepreneur in Kenya, the largest economy in the East African Community. He is the current managing director of Transworld Safaris Limited, a company that he owns. He also owns minority stakes in a number of publicly listed companies at the Nairobi Securities Exchange (NSE). He is reported to be one of Kenya's wealthiest citizens.

Investment portfolio
His investments include the tour company Transworld Safaris Limited, which he fully owns and where he serves as the managing director. He also serves as a non-executive director at Pan Africa Insurance, where he is the largest non-institutional shareholder. He also maintains significant shareholding in Barclays Bank Kenya, Bamburi Cement, Carbacid Investments, Diamond Trust Bank Group, and Safaricom. In July 2013, his holding in NSE-listed companies was valued at KSh2.4 billion (approx. US$27.5 million).

Investment philosophy
In keeping with many high-net-worth investors at the NSE, Baloobhai Patel invests primarily in blue chip stocks that pay regular dividends and have a tradition of steady appreciation in stock price. He rarely liquidates his stakes in these companies. He invests for the long-term, and occasionally invests more when the price temporarily falls. He is also diversified across many sectors of the economy, including manufacturing, banking, insurance, telecommunications and construction.

See also
Indian diaspora in East Africa
List of African millionaires
List of wealthiest people in Kenya

References

External links
 Transworld Safaris Limited Website

Living people
1938 births
Kenyan people of Indian descent
Kenyan businesspeople
Kenyan people of Gujarati descent
Kenyan philanthropists
People from Nairobi